Robert Gilliam may refer to:

Robert B. Gilliam (1805–1870), American politician and judge.
Robert Gilliam (1951–2005), birth name of Welsh guitarist Tich Gwilym